Michael Grove (born December 18, 1996) is an American professional baseball pitcher for the Los Angeles Dodgers of Major League Baseball (MLB). He was drafted by the Dodgers in the second round of the 2018 MLB draft out of West Virginia University and he made his MLB debut in 2022.

Amateur career
Grove played hockey, baseball and football at Wheeling Park High School in West Virginia. He then played college baseball at West Virginia University. As a sophomore in 2017, he had a 2.87 ERA with 61 strikeouts in 47 innings before his season ended because of an arm injury. He underwent Tommy John surgery in May 2017.

Professional career
Despite the injury he was picked in the second round of the 2018 MLB draft by the Los Angeles Dodgers, though he did not play in a professional game until 2019 when he made 21 starts for the Rancho Cucamonga Quakes. The 2020 season minor league season was cancelled because of the COVID-19 pandemic, but Grove was added to the player pool and trained at the alternate site at the University of Southern California. He played in 21 games for the Tulsa Drillers in 2021, where he was 1–4 with a 7.86 ERA in 21 games (19 starts). 

Grove was added to the Dodgers 40-man roster in November 2021. After beginning the 2022 season with Tulsa, Grove was promoted to the major leagues to make his debut as the starting pitcher against the Philadelphia Phillies on May 15, 2022. He pitched  innings in his debut, allowing four hits while walking three and striking out three. Four unearned runs scored off him and his first MLB strikeout was of Alec Bohm. On September 25, 2022, Grove picked up his first major league win against the St. Louis Cardinals. He made seven appearances in the majors, making six starts with one relief appearance. He allowed 15 earned runs in  innings for a 4.60 ERA. He also pitched in 19 games (17 starts) in the minors between Tulsa and the Triple-A Oklahoma City Dodgers, with a 1–5 record and 3.79 ERA.

References

External links

1996 births
Living people
Sportspeople from Wheeling, West Virginia
Baseball players from West Virginia
Major League Baseball pitchers
Los Angeles Dodgers players
West Virginia Mountaineers baseball players
Rancho Cucamonga Quakes players
Tulsa Drillers players
Oklahoma City Dodgers players